Kupyanka is a rural locality (a selo) in Popovskoye Rural Settlement, Bogucharsky District, Voronezh Oblast, Russia. The population was 1,062 as of 2010. There are 9 streets.

Geography 
Kupyanka is located on the left bank of the Bogucharka River, 5 km south of Boguchar (the district's administrative centre) by road. Boguchar is the nearest rural locality.

References 

Rural localities in Bogucharsky District